Camera Camera is the 1992 studio album by Nazia and Zoheb. Primarily in the Urdu language, the album also featured two English songs (If and If You Could Read My Mind). Reviews noted that the album was influenced by the Pet Shop Boys. The album came several years after the successful run of four LPs which had ended with the 1987 album Hotline. This fifth album enjoyed only modest success and was the duo's last.

Track list
Camera	
If	
Mehrbani	
Wala Wai	
Tali de Thullay	
Camera (Dance Mix)	
Nasha	
Pyar Ka Geet	
If You Could Read My Mind
Mama Papa	
Dil Ki Lagi	
Kyoun

Credits 
Vocals – Nazia Hassan, Zoheb Hassan

Lyrics By – Nazia Hassan and Zoheb Hassan, Indevar, Sabir Zafar.

Music By, Arranged By, Producer – Zoheb Hassan (tracks: 1, 2, 5, 6 to 10, 12)

Music By – Bappi Lahri (Tracks: 3, 4, 11), Mian Yousuf Sallauddin (Track 5), Gordon Lightfoot (Track 9)

Producer – Jamie Lane (tracks: 2, 9 )

Remix – Jamie Lane (tracks: 4, 6, 7)

Keyboards, Programmed By, Guitar – Tony Lowe

Saxophone – Martin Dobson

Tabla, Percussion – Kuljit Burma

Publisher: Timbuktu Records UK LTD

Photography By – D.C.B. Photos

Album Cover Design – The Bureaux Graphics Group

Notes 
On the CD inlay:

"We would really like to thank our fans; you are the reason for our success over the last decade. We would also like to thank our parents for their encouragement, guidance and support and all at Timbuktu records for believing in the project"

References

Urdu-language albums
1992 albums
Nazia and Zoheb albums
Nazia Hassan albums